The WTA 125K series is the secondary professional tennis circuit organised by the Women's Tennis Association. The 2018 WTA 125K series calendar consisted of ten tournaments, each with a total prize fund of $125,000 each except the Oracle Challenger Series that offer $150,000 in prize money. After 2017, Dalian Women's Tennis Open and Hawaii Tennis Open were scrapped while Hua Hin Championships was replaced by Thailand Open, an international WTA event to take place at the same venue, beginning February 2019. 5 new tournaments were introduced in Newport Beach, Indian Wells, Chicago, Houston and Anning which was earlier an ITF event.



Schedule

Statistical information 
These tables present the number of singles (S) and doubles (D) titles won by each player and each nation during the season.  The players/nations are sorted by: 1) total number of titles (a doubles title won by two players representing the same nation counts as only one win for the nation); 2) a singles > doubles hierarchy; 3) alphabetical order (by family names for players).

To avoid confusion and double counting, these tables should be updated only after an event is completed.

Titles won by player

Titles won by nation

Points distribution

References 

 
2018 in women's tennis
2018